Racing Club Albi XIII originally called Racing Club Albigeois XIII and more recently also known as Albi Tigers are a semi-professional rugby league team based in Albi in the Occitanie region in southern France. Formed in 1934 the club compete in the Elite One Championship the highest level of competition in France. They have won the French title on five occasions and the Lord Derby Cup once. Their current home stadium is Stade Mazicou.

History 

RC Albi were one of the founder clubs of Rugby League in France indeed they were the second club formed after US Villeneuve in May 1934. They were formed by Jean-Marie Vignal one of Jean Galia's pioneers who would be the club's first captain/coach and Simon Bompunt who would be the club's first chairman. Initially the club recruited from nearby Toulouse as the local Rugby Union club SC Albi refused players to move to the new club, only two would move in the early years. The club finished 7th in their debut season their first ever match finishing in a 6–26 defeat at Bordeaux XIII

In season 1937-38 despite finishing 7th the club won through the play-offs to reach the final and then caused a major upset, beating US Villeneuve 8–3 to lift their first trophy. They reached the semi-final in 1939–40 in what would be the last championship before war broke out. During the war the Vichy Government banned Rugby League in France. RC Albi were forced to join with the Rugby Union club in the town SC Albi under a new name Albi Olympique. After the war the club went back to Rugby League, they enjoyed a good spell at the end of the 1950s as they won the French rugby league championship three times in six years. They also hosted the touring Australia national rugby league team, losing in 1952 22-31 and 20–25 in 1956 but in 1959 they earned a fantastic 19–10 win against them in front of 5,845 spectators

Since then the club have not fared too well they have won the championship and cup once each, in 1977 and 1974 respectively. The club withdrew from the Elite One Championship at the end of season 2007-08 due to financial reasons but in 2014-15 they won the Elite Two Championship and returned to the top flight finishing a creditable 5th in 2015–16.

The club currently runs youth sides and a ladies team.

Colours and Badge 

The club have always played in amber and black. The Badge has been changed originally it was a French cockerel stood on a rugby ball with the number 13 on the ball. This was changed to a tiger next to a tower logo before the current one was used. The reference to 'Tigers' comes from the 90s when they followed many other clubs in adopting a moniker, possibly along the lines of Castleford Tigers who happen to play in the same colours

Stadium 

Stadium Municipal d'Albi has been the club's home ground since it opened for rugby in 1964. The main stand is a cantilever grandstand while opposite is newer stand both these stands are all seated, at either end there is terracing. In 1977 the French rugby league championship was held here despite RC Albi being in the final against AS Carcassonne. A record rugby crowd of 20,000 witnessed an Albi win, their last to date. In 1979 France national rugby league team beat the touring Papua New Guinea national rugby league team 16–9. The stadium underwent a major revamp in 2007 resulting in the now 13,058 capacity including 8,000 seated. They are currently based at Stade Mazicou.

Current squad 
Squad for 2021-22 Season

Notable players

 Jean-Marie Vignal
 Eric Anselme
 Jack Oster

Honours 

 French championship (5): 1937–38, 1955–56, 1957–58, 1961–62, 1976–77
 Lord Derby Cup (1): 1973-74
 Elite Two (2): 1990–91, 2014–15

References 

French rugby league teams
Sport in Albi
Sport in Tarn (department)
1934 establishments in France
Rugby clubs established in 1934